The Rivers State Senior Secondary Schools Board is an agency of the government of Rivers State responsible for the development and management of the state's secondary education system. It is headquartered in Port Harcourt. Its formation was authorized by the Senior Secondary Schools Board Law No.5 of 2012.

History
The Rivers State Post Primary Schools Board was set up in 1989 under the Post Primary Schools Board Law No.4 (1989). It was tasked with supervising public schools in Rivers State. In 2012, the PPSB Law was repealed and the board was renamed to its present name.

Composition
According to the Law, the governing board consists of:

Chairman
Four regular members
Permanent Secretary of the Ministry of Education
Five non-regular members

Duties and powers
The duties and powers of the board, as specified by the Law, are the following:

Recruit, appoint, post, promote, discipline and transfer both the academic and non academic staff of the Secondary Schools but in the case of principals and vice – principals, their promotion, transfer and discipline shall be made with the approval of the Commissioner; to handle inter-service and inter – state transfer of academic and non – academic staff other than those handled by the Civil Service Commission, subject to the approval of the Governor; to manage senior secondary schools and be responsible for:- supply of school equipment and materials for approved functions and programmes of the schools, provision of petty cash grants, provision and maintenance of school libraries, financing sporting activities, provision of transportation facilities to schools. Other functions of the board are: to establish and maintain an office in the headquarters of each local government area in the state for easy administration of schools in the local government area; keep proper and up-to-date teachers’ service records; recommend and approve applications of staff for in – service training to ministry; approve the budget of the board and to submit same to the ministry for consideration by government; etc.

See also
List of government agencies of Rivers State

References

Government agencies and parastatals of Rivers State
Education in Rivers State
State secondary education boards of Nigeria
Rivers State Ministry of Education